Noelle Kennedy is a camogie player and five-time All-Ireland winner in 1999, 2000, 2001, 2003, and 2004.

Career
Kennedy was largely responsible for Tipperary’s breakthrough to senior status in 1997. She won an All-Ireland in the 1999 All-Ireland Intermediate Final against County Clare; Kennedy scored five points in Tipperary's historic victory. She played in seven successive All-Ireland finals for Tipperary in 1999, 2000, 2001, 2002, 2003, 2004, and 2005.

References

External links
 Camogie.ie Official Camogie Association Website
 Wikipedia List of Camogie players

Tipperary camogie players
Living people
Year of birth missing (living people)